Monica Tidwell (born January 14, 1954) is an American model. She was born in Shreveport, Louisiana. A red-head, she was Playboy magazine's Playmate of the Month for the November 1973 issue; her centerfold was photographed by Dwight Hooker and Bill Frantz. Tidwell was the first Playmate who was younger than the magazine itself: she was 19 at the time of the photo shoot, having been born just as the second issue of Playboy was hitting the newsstands.

Tidwell was the Primary Producer of the 2008 Off Broadway play Mindgame in New York City.  Written by Anthony Horowitz (writer of Foyle's War), the play was directed by British film director Ken Russell and starred Keith Carradine, Lee Godart and Kathleen McNenny.

References

External links

1954 births
Living people
People from Shreveport, Louisiana
1970s Playboy Playmates